Yanya was also the Ottoman Turkish name of Ioannina

, it has 46 villages under its administration.

See also
List of township-level divisions of Shandong

References

Township-level divisions of Shandong
Zibo